Jozef Sládok (born 4 June 1988) is a Slovak professional ice hockey player who currently plays professionally for HKM Zvolen of the Slovak Extraliga.

Career statistics

Regular season and playoffs

International

References

External links

1988 births
Living people
Slovak ice hockey defencemen
Sportspeople from Zvolen
HKM Zvolen players
Plymouth Whalers players
HC '05 Banská Bystrica players
HC 07 Detva players
Romford Raiders players
Hull Stingrays players
Edinburgh Capitals players
Peterborough Phantoms players
HK Dukla Trenčín players
Slovak expatriate sportspeople in Scotland
Slovak expatriate sportspeople in England
Slovak expatriate ice hockey players in Finland
Slovak expatriate ice hockey players in the United States
Expatriate ice hockey players in England
Expatriate ice hockey players in Scotland